Polyptychoides mbarikensis is a moth of the  family Sphingidae. It is known from the Mbaraki Mountains in the Morogoro Province of Tanzania.

References

Polyptychoides
Moths described in 2005